Luis Alberto Sánchez Rodríguez (born 6 February 1988) is a former Mexican footballer professional who last played for Venados F.C.

He played with Los Cabos of the Liga de Balompié Mexicano during the league's inaugural season in 2020–21.

References

External links
 
 
 

Living people
1986 births
Mexican footballers
Tampico Madero F.C. footballers
C.F. Pachuca players
Tecos F.C. footballers
C.D. Veracruz footballers
Venados F.C. players
Club Celaya footballers
Liga MX players
Ascenso MX players
Liga Premier de México players
Tercera División de México players
Footballers from Baja California
Sportspeople from Tijuana
Association football midfielders
Liga de Balompié Mexicano players